Guohua Life Insurance Co., Ltd. is a Chinese life insurance company headquartered in Shanghai. Since 2016, the company was a subsidiary (51%) of Biocause Pharmaceutical, after the acquisition of the shares was approved by the China Insurance Regulatory Commission in the same year. The deal was announced in 2015.

Equity investments
 HNA Technology (14.33% as insurance-linked equity fund manager)

Sponsorship
Guohua Life was the naming rights sponsor of a Shanghai-based women volleyball team from 2011 to circa 2013.

References

External links
 

Financial services companies established in 2007
Insurance companies of China
Companies based in Shanghai
Civilian-run enterprises of China